Eliza Buckley Ingalls (August 24, 1848 – February 9, 1918) was an American temperance activist. Active in local and national activities of the Woman's Christian Temperance Union (WCTU), for twenty-seven years (1891-1918), Ingalls served as president of the federated white ribbon unions of St. Louis; and for twenty years, as superintendent of the national union's Anti-Narcotics Department.

Early years

Career
In 1880, she married Fred H. Ingalls, a successful merchant in St. Louis, Missouri. 

She was an active temperance worker since she was a child, having joined the order of Good Templars when only fourteen years of age. She served as superintendent of the anti-narcotics department of the National WCTU. Her special mission was the eradication of tobacco in all forms. She was assisted in her work by State superintendents, and the results were shown by the enactment of laws in nearly every State in the Union prohibiting the sale of tobacco to minors. She was determined and aggressive, holding to a strict accountability each one to whom a task was assigned. She served as vice-president of the Missouri W. C. T. U. when Clara Cleghorn Hoffman was its president and was long the National WCTU superintendent of Anti-Narcotics. Much of Missouri's legislation upon the subject was due to her efforts. Contemporaries whom she entertained at her home included Frances E. Willard, Lady Henry Somerset, and Anna A. Gordon.

Death

Her last message to the women of the St. Louis WCTU, a few days before she died, was typical of her nature: "Give the women my love and tell them to push on." Ingalls died February 9, 1918, after a continued illness of almost three years. Nelle G. Burger wrote Ingalls' obituary in The Union Signal.

References

Attribution

Bibliography

External links
 
 

1848 births
1918 deaths
Woman's Christian Temperance Union people
American temperance activists
People from St. Louis
Tobacco in the United States
Wikipedia articles incorporating text from A Woman of the Century